We Are Here is the name of two sculptures in Ashland, Oregon, United States.

Original sculpture
The original , 3,000-pound wooden sculpture was carved from an alder tree by Russell Beebe to commemorate indigenous peoples of Southern Oregon. It was installed at the intersection of Lithia Way and North Main. The artwork was gifted to the City of Ashland in 2006. Relocation was required to prevent deterioration, and the sculpture was moved to the Hannon Library on the Southern Oregon University campus during the 2010s.

Replica
A bronze replica by Jack Langford was installed on a base by Jesse Biesanz at the site of the original sculpture.

References

External links

 We Are Here – Ashland, OR at Waymarking

Bronze sculptures in Oregon
Monuments and memorials in Oregon
Outdoor sculptures in Ashland, Oregon
Southern Oregon University
Wooden sculptures in Oregon